Pavel Grigoryevich Antokolsky (1 July 1896, Saint Petersburg, Russian Empire – 9 October 1978, Moscow, Soviet Union) was a Soviet and Russian poet and theatre director. His father was a nephew of sculptor Mark Antokolsky.

In the 1930s, Antokolsky worked as a director in the Vakhtangov Theatre in Moscow. During World War II, he ran a front theatre and was awarded a Stalin Prize for a long poem about the Germans killing his son. After the war, he managed a theatre in Tomsk. His poem, "All we who in his name..." was written in 1956, the year of Nikita Khrushchev's "secret speech" condemning Stalinism, and widely circulated among student groups in the 1950s.

Among other works, Pavel Antokolsky translated in Russian Le Dernier jour d'un condamne and Le roi s'amuse, by Victor Hugo.

External links
Pavel Antokolsky: The Official Web Site (in Russian)
Collection of Poems by Pavel Antokolsky (English Translations)

1978 deaths
1896 births
20th-century Russian male writers
20th-century Russian poets
20th-century Russian translators
Communist Party of the Soviet Union members
Stalin Prize winners
Recipients of the Order of the Red Banner of Labour
Jewish poets
Russian Jews
Russian male poets

Russian translators
Soviet male poets
Soviet translators